Sa Yite is a 2019 Burmese drama film, directed by Aww Yatha starring Lu Min, Kyaw Htet Aung, Htun Eaindra Bo and Khine Thin Kyi. The film, produced by Aung Khit Min Film Production premiered Myanmar on May 30, 2019.

Cast
Kyaw Htet Aung as Tin Maung Win
Lu Min as Nyo Htun Lu
Khine Thin Kyi as Bae Eu Ma
Htun Eaindra Bo as Ma Yin Hla

References

2019 films
2010s Burmese-language films
Films shot in Myanmar
2019 drama films
Burmese drama films